The Great Lakes Depression (Ikh Nuuruudyn Khotgor), also called the Great Lakes' Hollow, is a large semi-arid depression in Mongolia that covers parts of the Uvs, Khovd, Bayan-Ölgii, Zavkhan and Govi-Altai aimags.  Bounded by the Altai in the West, Khangai in the East and Tannu-Ola Mountains in the North,

Small northern parts of the depression are part of Russia.

The depression is named so because it contains six major Mongolian lakes: saline Uvs Nuur, Khyargas Nuur and Dörgön Nuur; and freshwater Khar-Us Nuur, Khar Nuur and Airag Nuur, as well as a number of smaller ones.  In addition, it includes  of solonchaks and large sandy areas.  Northern parts are dominated by arid steppes, and southern by semideserts or deserts. The major rivers are Khovd River, Zavkhan Gol, and Tesiin Gol.

Ecology
The depression is a major freshwater basin of Mongolia and contains important wetlands of Central Asia. The wetlands are based on the system of interconnected shallow lakes with wide reed belts within a generally desert steppe. The wetlands support a number of rare migrating birds: Eurasian spoonbill (Platalea leucorodia), black stork (Ciconia nigra), osprey (Pandion haliaetus), white-tailed eagle (Haliaeetus albicilla), swan goose (Cygnopsis cygnoides), and bar-headed goose (Anser indicus). Only a few individuals of great white pelican (Pelecanus onocrotalus) remain in the Great Lakes Basin in Mongolia. They nest in catchment areas of rivers and lakes that have abundant fish and vegetation.

Although the total number of fish species in the region is low, a large percentage of those that do occur are endemic or near-endemic, especially from the genera Oreoleuciscus (Altai osmans), Thymallus (graylings) and Triplophysa (a stone loach genus).

References

External links
 Birdsview of the Great Lakes Depression computer visualization generated from satellite data, showing (from front to back) Dörgön Nuur, Khar Nuur, Khovd, Khyargas Nuur, and Uvs Nuur, as well as Üüreg Nuur left of Uvs Nuur. The green line on the left is the valley of the Khovd Gol with Khar-Us Nuur and Achit Nuur.

Depressions of Mongolia
Depressions of Russia